During the 1936–37 English football season, Brentford competed in the Football League First Division and secured a 6th-place finish, one place below the previous season's club record highest league position.

Season summary
After a club record 5th-place finish in Brentford's debut season in the top flight, manager Harry Curtis kept faith with the season's previous squad, releasing outside forward Jim Brown and bringing in youngsters Harry Bamford and Joe Murray. Teenage outside right Les Smith, who had signed his first professional contract a year earlier, was promoted to the first team squad after Bobby Reid was struck down by appendicitis on the eve of the season.

After a mixed start to the season, Brentford kicked into gear in late September 1936, losing just four of 19 matches to establish themselves in the top three in the First Division. In his first full season with the Bees, forward David McCulloch again showed prolific form, going on to score 33 goals in his 43 appearances. Five goals in a six match spell also saw forward Billy Scott win an England cap in a British Home Championship match versus Wales in October 1937, which made him Brentford's first full England international player. Brentford's form dipped in mid-February 1937 and despite the signing of Buster Brown to replace the departed Dai Richards at left half, the club dropped to a 6th-place finish.

A 6–2 defeat to champions-elect Manchester City on 3 April equalled the club record for most goals conceded in a Football League match. Despite a number of other heavy defeats, manager Harry Curtis did improve the team's winning percentage in both the league and FA Cup, with Brentford hammering Huddersfield Town 5–0 in the third round (the first time the Bees had scored in the FA Cup for over four years) before exiting at the hands of Derby County in the following round.

At the end of the season, Brentford set off on a tour of Nazi Germany, beating Hamburger SV (3–0), Hertha BSC (4–0), drawing 2–2 with champions 1. FC Nürnberg and losing 4–0 to Schalke 04. The Star published a picture of the team giving a Nazi salute prior to the Schalke match, which caused a minor stir in London.

League table

Results
Brentford's goal tally listed first.

Legend

Football League First Division

FA Cup

 Sources: Statto, 11v11, 100 Years of Brentford

Playing squad 
Players' ages are as of the opening day of the 1936–37 season.

 Sources: 100 Years of Brentford, Timeless Bees, Football League Players' Records 1888 to 1939

Coaching staff

Statistics

Appearances and goals

Players listed in italics left the club mid-season.
Source: 100 Years of Brentford

Goalscorers 

Players listed in italics left the club mid-season.
Source: 100 Years of Brentford

International caps

Management

Summary

Transfers & loans 
Cricketers are not included in this list.

References 

Brentford F.C. seasons
Brentford